Henry Hooper was an American football player.

Henry Hooper may also refer to:

Henry Northey Hooper (1799–1865), American manufacturer and merchant
Henry Hooper, namesake of Hoopers Island

See also
Harry Hooper (disambiguation)